Rutidosis leptorrhynchoides, commonly known as  button wrinklewort, is a flowering plant in the family Asteraceae. It is an upright, tufted, perennial herb with bright green leaves and yellow button-shaped flowers.

Description

Taxonomy
Rutidosis leptorrhynchoides was first formally described in 1866 by Ferdinand von Mueller and the description was published in Fragmenta Phytographiae Australiae.

Distribution and habitat
Button wrinklewort grows in grassland and woodland in New South Wales, Victoria and the Australian Capital Territory.

Conservation
It is an endangered species under the Australian Environment Protection and Biodiversity Conservation Act 1999.

References

Gnaphalieae
Asterales of Australia
Flora of the Australian Capital Territory
Flora of New South Wales
Flora of Victoria (Australia)
Endangered flora of Australia
Taxa named by Ferdinand von Mueller